Huntington is an unincorporated community in Emmet County, Iowa, United States.

Huntington got its start in 1899, following the construction of the Minneapolis & St. Louis railroad through that territory.

References

Unincorporated communities in Emmet County, Iowa
Unincorporated communities in Iowa